Atractides is a genus of mites belonging to the family Hygrobatidae.

The genus was first described by Koch in 1836.

The genus has cosmopolitan distribution.

Species:
 Atractides acutirostris
 Atractides digitatus
 Atractides nodipalpis
 Atractides ovalis
 Atractides pavesii

References

Trombidiformes
Trombidiformes genera